Florence Hervé (born 17 April 1944) is a Franco-German journalist, historian and feminist activist.   In the words of one commentator, she "moves in a space between scholarship and journalism".   Since 1993 she has also appeared regularly on broadcast media.

In 2014 the German government wanted to award her the "Bundesverdienstkreuz". She rejected the state decoration explaining in an open letter to the then President of Germany Joachim Gauck that although the honour came in recognition of her many years of unpaid work on women's issues and policies, along with Franco-German co-operation and international co-operation more generally, her work had frequently placed her in direct opposition to whichever one of a succession of German governments was in power at the time.

Biography

Florence Hervé was born at Boulogne-sur-Seine, a western suburb of Paris dominated by the automobile industry.   She grew up in a conservative but relatively open-minded family in the suburb of Ville-d'Avray, a short distance to the west of Boulogne.   Passing her Abitur (school final exams) in 1961 opened the way to university level education.   She studied Germanistics at Bonn, Heidelberg and Paris, from where she received her doctorate.   Along the way she had also, in 1963, received a degree as a translator from the Dolmetsch Institute (specialising in simultaneous translation) at the University of Heidelberg.

Hervé has worked as a freelance journalist since 1969.    She has contributed to a range of mainly left-of-center publications, including Réforme, Deutsche Volkszeitung, Frankfurter Rundschau, Kölner Stadt-Anzeiger and Junge Welt.   She also became involved in various feminist organisations and initiatives.   In the mid-1970s she was a co-founder with Alma Kettig of the Democratic Women's Initiative ("Demokratische Fraueninitiative").   She is a co-producer of the feminist quarterly journal Wir Frauen and of the publication's calendar, produced since 1979.   Since 1975 she has also engaged in the feminist movement across Europe and internationally as a member of the leadership team in the Women's International Democratic Federation between 1994 and 2002, and between 1996 and 2004 in the feminist "Freedom for Leyla Zana" initiative.

Issues on which her work as an author and editor focuses include confrontation with fascism and colonialism, the history of anti-fascist resistance and the conditions of women in the global south and north.

In 2014, in her very public rejection of a government proposal to award he the government wanted to award her the "Bundesverdienstkreuz", she stated that she had no wish to give the impression that she had made her political peace with the ruling establishment.

Personal
Florence Hervé has two grown-up daughters as a result of her brief marriage.

Publications (selection)

Notes

References

People from Boulogne-Billancourt
People from Hauts-de-Seine
German women journalists
French women journalists
German feminists
French feminist writers
German Communist Party members
1944 births
Living people